Lorraine Fenton (born Lorraine Graham on 8 September 1973 in Manchester) is a retired Jamaican athlete who specialized in the 400 metres.

Career
Her career highlight came when she won the Olympic silver medal in 2000, being the first Jamaican woman to win a medal in this event. She also won silver medals at the 2001 and 2003 World Championships, a bronze medal at the 1999 World Championships, as well as gold, silver and bronze medals in the relay. In 2002, she set a Jamaican record in 400 m with 49.30 seconds.

She missed the 2004 Olympic season due to a hamstring injury, but she returned to win a silver medal with the 4 x 400 metres relay team at the 2005 World Championships in Athletics (together with Shericka Williams, Novlene Williams and Ronetta Smith). She retired after the 2006 season.

Achievements

Personal bests

External links
 
 Lorraine Fenton retires - IAAF.org

1973 births
Living people
Jamaican female sprinters
Olympic athletes of Jamaica
Athletes (track and field) at the 2000 Summer Olympics
Olympic silver medalists for Jamaica
People from Manchester Parish
World Athletics Championships medalists
Medalists at the 2000 Summer Olympics
Olympic silver medalists in athletics (track and field)
Goodwill Games medalists in athletics
World Athletics Championships winners
Competitors at the 2001 Goodwill Games
Olympic female sprinters
20th-century Jamaican women
21st-century Jamaican women